Claremont Airport, formerly known as Cecil County Airport and Raintree Airpark , is an airport located  south of Elkton, Maryland, United States.

History 
In 2013, the airport was sold for $1.35 million.

References

External links 
Claremont Airport official website
YouTube of landing at Cecil County

Airports in Maryland
Transportation buildings and structures in Cecil County, Maryland
Airports established in 1977
1977 establishments in Maryland